Village Barn Dance is a 1940 American comedy film directed by Frank McDonald, written by Dorrell McGowan and Stuart E. McGowan, and starring Richard Cromwell, Doris Day, George Barbier, Esther Dale, Robert Baldwin and Andrew Tombes. It was released on January 30, 1940, by Republic Pictures.

Plot

Cast
Richard Cromwell as Dan Martin
Doris Day as Betty Withers
George Barbier as Uncle Si
Esther Dale as Minerva Withers
Robert Baldwin as James Rutherford Jr.
Andrew Tombes as James Rutherford Sr.
Myrtle Wiseman as Lulu Belle 
Scotty Wiseman as Scotty 
Barbara Jo Allen as Vera 
Frank Cook as Harmonica Player
Don Wilson as Radio Announcer
Helen Troy as Singer

References

External links
 

1940 films
American comedy films
1940 comedy films
Republic Pictures films
Films directed by Frank McDonald
Films scored by William Lava
American black-and-white films
1940s English-language films
1940s American films